The following Union Army units and commanders fought in the Battle of Shiloh of the American Civil War. The Confederate order of battle is shown separately. Order of battle compiled from the army organization, return of casualties and reports.

Abbreviations used

Military rank
 MG = Major General
 BG = Brigadier General
 Col = Colonel
 Ltc = Lieutenant Colonel
 Maj = Major
 Cpt = Captain
 Lt = Lieutenant

Artillery
 3" R = 3 inch caliber ordnance rifle
 How = Howitzer
 lb = pound (projectile weight)
 Nap = M1857 Napoleon Gun
 R = Rifled Gun
 SB = Smoothbore Gun

Other
 w = wounded
 mw = mortally wounded
 k = killed
 c = captured

Army of the Tennessee

MG Ulysses S. Grant, Commanding

General Staff & Headquarters
 Chief of Staff: Col Joseph D. Webster
 Chief of Engineers: Col James B. McPherson
 Assistant Adjutant General: Cpt. John A. Rawlins
 Chief Commissary: Cpt. John Parker Hawkins

Army of the Ohio

MG Don Carlos Buell, Commanding
 Chief of Staff: Col James B. Fry
 Assistant Adjutant General: Cpt. John M. Wright
 Topographical Engineer: Cpt. Nathaniel Michler
 Assistant Quartermaster: Cpt. Alvan C. Gillem
 Assistant Inspector General: Cpt. Charles C. Gilbert

Notes

References
U.S. War Department, The War of the Rebellion: a Compilation of the Official Records of the Union and Confederate Armies, U.S. Government Printing Office, 1880–1901.
 Cunningham, O. Edward. Shiloh and the Western Campaign of 1862. Edited by Gary Joiner and Timothy Smith. New York: Savas Beatie, 2007. .
 McDonough, James Lee. Shiloh: In Hell before Night. University of Tennessee Press, 1977. 

American Civil War orders of battle